George James Anderson (1860 – 15 December 1935) was a Reform Party Member of Parliament, and a minister in the Reform Government from 1912 to 1928.

Biography

He won the Mataura electorate in Southland in the 1908 general election, defeating a government minister Robert McNab on his entry into politics. He held the seat until he was defeated in the 1928 general election.

He was Minister of Internal Affairs (1919–25), and Minister of Labour, Mines and Marine (1919–28).

He was appointed to the Legislative Council in 1934 and served until he died in 1935.

In 1935, he was awarded the King George V Silver Jubilee Medal.

References

Entry at Dictionary of New Zealand Biography

1860 births
1935 deaths
Reform Party (New Zealand) MPs
Members of the Cabinet of New Zealand
Members of the New Zealand Legislative Council
Australian emigrants to New Zealand
Reform Party (New Zealand) MLCs
Members of the New Zealand House of Representatives
New Zealand MPs for South Island electorates
Unsuccessful candidates in the 1928 New Zealand general election